Lippershey is a relatively tiny lunar impact crater located in the southeast section of the Mare Nubium. It was named after German-Dutch optician Hans Lippershey. It is a circular, cup-shaped feature surrounded by the lunar mare. Lippershey lies to the northeast of the crater Pitatus.

Satellite craters
By convention these features are identified on lunar maps by placing the letter on the side of the crater midpoint that is the closest to Lippershey.

References

 
 
 
 
 
 
 
 
 
 
 

Impact craters on the Moon